Liberty Township is one of fourteen townships in Shelby County, Indiana. As of the 2010 census, its population was 1,772 and it contained 723 housing units.

History
Liberty Township was established in 1840.

Liberty Township Schoolhouse No. 2 and Middletown Bridge are listed on the National Register of Historic Places.

Geography

Unincorporated towns
 Blue Ridge
 Meltzer
 Middletown
 Waldron

References

External links
 Indiana Township Association
 United Township Association of Indiana

Townships in Shelby County, Indiana
Townships in Indiana